The 2018–19 UMKC Kangaroos men's basketball team represented the University of Missouri–Kansas City during the 2018–19 NCAA Division I men's basketball season. The Kangaroos, led by sixth-year head coach Kareem Richardson, played their home games at the Swinney Recreation Center and Municipal Auditorium as members of the Western Athletic Conference. They finished the season 11–21, 6-10 in WAC play to finish in a tie for seventh place. They lost in the quarterfinals of the WAC tournament to Utah Valley.

This was the team's final season as the UMKC Kangaroos. On July 1, 2019, the athletic department announced its rebranding as the Kansas City Roos. The university name did not change.

Previous season
The Kangaroos finished the 2017–18 season 10–22, 5–9 in WAC play to finish in a tie for sixth place. They lost in the quarterfinals of the WAC tournament to Grand Canyon.

Roster

Schedule and results

|-
!colspan=9 style=| Regular season

|-
!colspan=9 style=| WAC regular season

|-
!colspan=9 style=| WAC tournament

Source:

References

Kansas City Roos men's basketball seasons
UMKC
UMKC Kanga
UMKC Kanga